Huda Ziad (born 6 May 1983) is a Pakistani former cricketer who played as a right-handed batter. She appeared in 15 One Day Internationals for Pakistan between 2001 and 2003, including playing at the inaugural edition of the Women's Cricket World Cup Qualifier in 2003.

References

External links
 
 

1983 births
Living people
Cricketers from Karachi
Pakistani women cricketers
Pakistan women One Day International cricketers